Las aventuras del capitán Alatriste is a Spanish adventure television series set in the early 17th century, consisting of an adaptation of the Captain Alatriste novel series by Arturo Pérez-Reverte, starring Aitor Luna in the lead role. It aired from January 2015 to April 2015 on Telecinco.

Premise 
The fiction takes place in the first half of the 17th century. It follows the adventures of the Captain Alatriste (Aitor Luna), taking him—besides Madrid—to Paris and Vatican City.

Cast 
 Aitor Luna as Diego Alatriste.
 Natasha Yarovenko	as María de Castro.
 Lucía Jiménez	as Caridad la Lebrijana.
 Patricia Vico	as Teresa de Alquézar.
  as Francisco de Quevedo.
 Filippo Sbalchiero as Gualterio Malatesta.
 Gary Piquer as Count-Duke of Olivares.
 Marcos Ruiz as Íñigo de Balboa y Aguirre.
  as Angélica de Alquezar.
 Rafael Cebrián as Count of Guadalmedina.
  as Fray Emilio Bocanegra.
 Luis Callejo as Luis de Alquézar. 
  as Sebastián Copons.
 Diana Gómez as Infanta Anna.
 William Miller as the Duke of Buckingham.
 Constantin von Jascheroff as the Prince of Wales.
 Aura Garrido as Inés de Castro. 
 Daniel Alonso as Felipe IV.
 Manuel Gancedo as Domine Pérez.
 Ángel Solo as Saldaña.
 Enrique Martínez as Rafael de Cózar.
 Janka Erdely as Isabel de Borbón.
 Sofía Oria as Dorotea.
 Lluís Bou as Vasco.
 Arly Jover as Madame de Brissac.
  as Richelieu

Production and release 
Las aventuras del capitán Alastriste consists of an adaptation of the novel series of the same name by Arturo Pérez Reverte, known as "Captain Alatriste" in English. The screenplay was authored by Alberto Macías, Curro Royo, Carlos Molinero, Marisol Farré and David Muñoz. Produced by Mediaset España and Beta Film in collaboration with DLO Producciones, the series was shot in the Korda Studios in Budapest, Hungary. Episodes were directed by Enrique Urbizu, Norberto López Amado, Salvador Calvo, Luis Oliveros and Alberto Ruiz Rojo.

The series premiered on 7 January 2015. The first episode drew mediocre ratings, particularly taking into account the series was a blockbuster production and it had been heavily promoted. Interest plummeted afterwards. It also became the target of fierce criticism already before the airing of the first episode, including criticism by the union of audio visual technicians for the choice of Hungary as shooting location. Pérez-Reverte himself was irritated by some historical implausibilities, the "excessive coloring" of the series instead of the gloomy cinematography imagined by the author as well as by the programming of the episodes after a brief recap of Gran Hermano VIP, although he defended the performance of Aitor Luna as a "very worthy" Alatriste. Paolo Vasile, CEO of Mediaset España, was also reportedly unconvinced of the series before its release. Following the dismal ratings in prime time, the channel decided to extend the running time of Gran Hermano VIP and thus relegate the series to the late night slot. The series' finale aired on 1 April 2015, with a 5.4% share and 486,000 viewers. Overall, the series averaged 1,049,000 viewers and a meagre 7.2% audience share.

References 

2015 Spanish television series debuts
2015 Spanish television series endings
Television shows set in Madrid
Television shows set in Paris
Television shows set in Vatican City
Television shows filmed in Hungary
Television series based on Spanish novels
Television series set in the 17th century
2010s Spanish drama television series
Spanish adventure television series
Telecinco network series
Television series by DLO Producciones